The Roman Catholic Diocese of Darwin is a suffragan Latin Rite diocese of the Archdiocese of Adelaide based in Darwin, Northern Territory, Australia.

As the largest diocese in Australia by physical area covered, the Darwin diocese was initially administered by the Vicariate Apostolic of New Holland and Van Diemen's Land. In 1845 the Vicariate Apostolic of Essington was erected; becoming elevated as part of the Diocese of Victoria in 1847; as the Diocese of Victoria-Palmerston in 1888; and its name changed to the Diocese of Darwin in 1938.

Ordinaries
The following individuals have been elected as Roman Catholic Bishops of Darwin or any of its precursor titles:
{| class="wikitable"
!Order
!Name
!Title
!Date enthroned
!Reign ended
!Term of office
!Reason for term end
|-
|align="center"| ||Joseph Serra y Juliá, OSB † ||Bishop of Victoria ||align="center"|9 July 1847 ||align="center"|7 August 1849 ||align="right"| ||Elevated as Coadjutor Bishop of Perth
|-
|align="center"| ||Rosendo Salvado, OSB † ||Bishop of Victoria ||align="center"|9 August 1849 ||align="center"|1 August 1888 ||align="right"| ||Resigned and appointed as Titular Bishop of Adraa
|-
|rowspan=2 align="center"| ||rowspan=2|Francis Xavier Gsell, MSC † ||Apostolic Administrator of Victoria-Palmerston||align="center"|23 April 1906 ||align="center"|29 March 1938 ||align="right"| ||Elevated as Bishop of Darwin
|-
|Bishop of Darwin||align="center"|29 March 1938 ||align="center"|10 November 1948 ||align="right"| ||Retired and appointed as Bishop Emeritus of Darwin
|-
|align="center"| ||John Patrick O'Loughlin, MSC †||Bishop of Darwin ||align="center"|13 January 1949 ||align="center"|14 November 1985 ||align="right"| || Died in office
|-
|align="center"| ||Edmund John Patrick Collins, MSC † ||Bishop of Darwin ||align="center"|28 April 1986 ||align="center"|3 July 2007 ||align="right"| || Retired and appointed as Bishop Emeritus of Darwin
|-
|align="center"| ||Eugene Hurley ||Bishop of Darwin ||align="center"|3 July 2007 ||align="center"|27 June 2018||align="right"| ||  Retired and appointed as Bishop Emeritus of Darwin
|-
|align="center"| || Charles Gauci || Bishop of Darwin ||align="center"|26 September 2018 ||present  ||  ||
|}

Cathedral
See St Mary's Star of the Sea Cathedral, Darwin.

See also

 Catholic Church in Australia

References

External links
Catholic Diocese of Darwin

Darwin
Darwin, Roman Catholic Diocese of
Catholic Church in the Northern Territory
Darwin
Darwin
Darwin